Diego Andrés Camargo Pineda (born 3 May 1998 in Tuta, Boyacá) is a Colombian professional road racing cyclist, who currently rides for UCI WorldTeam .

Major results

2020
 1st  Overall Vuelta a Colombia
1st  Young rider classification
 1st  Overall Vuelta de la Juventud de Colombia
2021
 2nd Time trial, National Road Championships
2022
 3rd Time trial, National Road Championships

Grand Tour general classification results timeline

References

External links

1998 births
Living people
Colombian male cyclists
Sportspeople from Boyacá Department
21st-century Colombian people